is an original anime television series produced by Production I.G which premiered on October 11, 2019 on the Animeism programming block.

Story
Taking place in modern times in and around Kabukicho in a re-imagining of Sherlock Holmes, a team of detectives are solving a string of serial murders committed by Jack the Ripper.

Cases hounding Kabukicho and its residents are brokered by Mrs. Hudson through Pipe Cat, an underground bar, where the detectives meet to accept the cases that interest them.

Characters
 
 
Sherlock is an eccentric individual who once dreamed of becoming a rakugoka but failed. He became a detective instead and is one of the detectives of detective row. He employs rakugo once he has deduced the answers to the case at hand. 
 
 
John is currently employed at a university hospital on the west side of Shinjuku but had to cross over to Kabukichou in order to get someone help him with an odd case. His search leads him to the Pipe Cat.
 
 
James is the acting leader of the Kabukicho Irregulars, a group of children who have made it their mission to steal from the rich and support the needy. It is later revealed that he is the son of the ward mayor and has stayed in Kabukicho to track and take revenge on the serial killer who killed his twin sister. 
 
 
 
 
She is the younger of the Morstan siblings, who grew up with her older sister as her only companion. On the day she was taken up for adoption, she decided to run away to Kabukicho with Lucy. 
 
 
Lucy is the older of the Morstan siblings. When they were younger, she run away to the east side with Mary. She dresses as a man and is usually mistaken as such.

Production and release

Anime
The original anime television series by Production I.G was announced on August 9, 2018. The series is directed by Ai Yoshimura and written by Taku Kishimoto, with Toshiyuki Yahagi handling character designs. Takurō Iga is composing the music. It premiered on October 11, 2019 on the Animeism programming block on MBS, TBS, and BS-TBS. Ego-Wrappin' performed the series' opening theme song "CAPTURE", while Lozareena performed the series' ending theme song "Hyakuoku Kōnen". Huwie Ishizaki will perform the series' second ending theme song "Parade". The series will run for two cours. Funimation has licensed the series for a simuldub.

Prior to the show being announced, it was known as Kabukicho no Yatsu (That Man in Kabukicho).

A six-episode OVA series was released on August 26, 2020. It centers on Moriarty's background and the release included the original pilot video and audio commentaries made by the main cast.

Manga
A manga version is serialized in Monthly Comic Garden and written by Kinu Mizukoshi. It was released on January 4, 2020.

Novel
As of 2019 a novel version will be serialized by Kadokawa Shoten under the Kadokawa Bunko novel label, which will have an original story.

Web radio
A web radio show, known as Kabukicho Pipecat Radio, aired its first radio episode on October 9, 2019. It is hosted by Junichi Suwabe and Tatsumaru Tachibana.

References

External links
Anime official website 

2019 anime television series debuts
2020 anime OVAs
Anime with original screenplays
Animeism
Funimation
Mystery anime and manga
Production I.G
Sherlock Holmes television series
Television series about Jack the Ripper
Television shows set in Tokyo